Alrewas is a village and civil parish in the Lichfield District of Staffordshire, England.

Geography
The parish is bounded by the Trent to the north and east, and by field boundaries to the south and west. The A38 road passes the village, which is just inside the boundary of the National Forest.

Until 2009 Alrewas was part of the civil parish of Alrewas and Fradley. Fradley had begun as a hamlet in the ancient parish of Alrewas, and the civil parish was named to reflect Fradley's growth into a village. From 1 April 2009 Alrewas and Fradley have been two separate civil parishes. Near Alrewas are the villages of Wychnor, Barton-under-Needwood, Fradley and Kings Bromley.

The 2011 Census recorded the parish population as 2,852.

Toponym
The toponym "Alrewas" is derived from the Old English Alor-wæsse, meaning "alluvial land growing with alder trees".

Places of interest

The A38 dual carriageway follows the line of Ryknild Street, a Roman road that linked what are now Gloucestershire and South Yorkshire.

It was built in 1668 and extended in the early 18th century.

The Trent and Mersey Canal was built between 1766 and 1777. It passes through Alrewas, where northeast of the village it has a junction with the River Trent.

The South Staffordshire Line of the South Staffordshire Railway was built through the parish in the 1840s and Alrewas railway station was opened in 1849. British Railways closed the station in 1965, but this part of the line remains open.

East of Alrewas is the National Memorial Arboretum, dedicated to remembering those lost due to warfare since the Second World War.

Churches
The Church of England parish church is All Saints in Church Lane. The oldest parts of the building are 12th-century. Some Norman work remains but much of the present building is Gothic from the 13th, 14th and 16th centuries. The font is 15th-century. The pulpit is Jacobean, made in 1639. There is a monument by Thomas White to John Turton, who died in 1707. The church was restored in 1997. All Saints' is a Grade I listed building.

The Methodist Church is in Post Office Road opposite the Crown Inn. It is a Gothic Revival brick building completed in 1928. In 1989 due to rot the roof was renewed. At the same time a new floor was laid, involving the removal of pews and organ.

School
All Saints Primary School is the local Church of England primary school. It is a small primary school which is only slightly more than single form entry.

Public houses
The village has three pubs: the Crown Inn, the George and Dragon and the William IV. The Crown is a pub and restaurant in Post Office Road. The George and Dragon is an 18th-century building in Main Street. The William IV was three cottages until the 1830s, when it was converted into a pub.

The National Memorial Arboretum

The National Memorial Arboretum is at Alrewas. It "honours the fallen, recognises service and sacrifice, and fosters pride in our country". The Arboretum is a charity run by staff and volunteers, and part of The Royal British Legion group of charities. An Act of Remembrance, including a silence, is observed daily in the Millennium Chapel. The Arboretum receives about 300,000 visitors a year.

Culture
The village holds the biennial Alrewas Arts Festival every other summer. The first festival was in 2006, and it has become a much loved attraction in the village's calendar. It is an eight-day free festival that includes workshops, performances, exhibitions and events in Alrewas village. It features local artistic and artisan talents. The workshops range from silk painting to film making. There is fund raising including auctions and sales in the intermediate 2-year period to meet the festival's costs. It culminates in a Sunday daytime to evening event of live music, comedy and interactive arts in Alrewas Park that attracts thousands of party-goers from surrounding villages and towns.

Each year the village hosts the Alrewas Show, which is a registered charity. It includes a walking carnival procession (formerly driven floats), galloping acrobatics, a falconry display, miniature steam display, Punch and Judy show, livestock display, fairground rides and attractions, trade stands, historic cars, farm machinery and music.

Buildings

Gallery

Sport & Leisure

Cricket 
Alrewas Cricket Club is an English amateur cricket club with a history of cricket in the village dating back to 1879. The club ground is based on Daisy Lane. Alrewas CC have 3 Saturday senior XI teams that compete in the Derbyshire County Cricket League, a Sunday XI team in the Lichfield & District Cricket League, a Women's team in the West Midlands Women’s Cricket League, a Woman's softball team and an established junior training section that play competitive cricket in the Burton & District Youth Cricket League.

Tennis
Alrewas Tennis was founded in 2013. The club has a LTA Tennismark accreditation and are registered by HMRC as a Community Amateur Sports Club. Coaching sessions for adults and juniors are provided and facilities include two floodlit, painted tarmac courts.

See also
Listed buildings in Alrewas

References

Further reading

External links

Alrewas Parish Council
Alrewas Archives
Alrewas Arts Festival

Civil parishes in Staffordshire
Villages in Staffordshire